The 2020 Auburn Tigers softball team represents Auburn University in the 2020 NCAA Division I softball season. The Tigers play their home games at the Jane B. Moore Field.

Previous season

The Tigers finished the 2019 season 39–21 overall, and 10–14 in the SEC to finish tenth in the conference. The Tigers went 2–2 in the Tucson Regional during the 2019 NCAA Division I softball tournament.

Preseason

SEC preseason poll
The SEC preseason poll was released on January 15, 2020.

Schedule and results

Source:
*Rankings are based on the team's current ranking in the NFCA poll.

Rankings

References

Auburn
Auburn Tigers softball seasons
Auburn Tigers softball